The Roberts class''' of monitors of the Royal Navy consisted of two heavily gunned vessels built during the Second World War. They were the Roberts, completed in 1941, and Abercrombie, completed in 1943.

Features of the class, apart from two 15-inch guns in a twin mounting (taken from two First World War era Marshal Ney class monitors), were shallow draught for operating inshore, broad beam to give stability (and also resistance to torpedoes and mines) and a high observation platform to observe fall of shot.

Ships

: Reused the turret of the World War I monitor Marshal Soult. Roberts provided bombardment support during Operation Torch in North Africa, where she was damaged by two 500 kg bombs. She was repaired in time to support the Allied invasion of Sicily, landings near Salerno, invasion of Normandy, and landing at Westkapelle.

One of Roberts guns (formerly in HMS Resolution) is mounted outside the Imperial War Museum in Lambeth, South London, together with one from the battleship Ramillies. Roberts herself was sold for scrapping shortly after the war, but hired back by the Royal Navy as an accommodation ship at Devonport until 1965.
She was damaged by contact mines on several occasions while supporting the invasion of Italy, but was repaired. On completion of repairs, Abercrombie'' was sent for service in the Pacific, although the war ended before her arrival. She was used as a gunnery training and accommodation ship at Chatham after the war.

References

Bibliography

External links
Roberts class monitors
HMS Roberts
HMS Abercrombie

Monitor classes